Ken Gittens (born 18 January 1966) is an Australian former professional rugby league footballer who played for the Penrith Panthers and the Brisbane Broncos in the late 1980s.

A winger, Gittens won a Brisbane Rugby League premiership with Souths Magpies in 1985. From 1987 to 1988 he played first-grade for Penrith, then in 1989 was reunited with his former Souths Magpies coach Wayne Bennett at the Brisbane Broncos.

References

External links
Ken Gittens at Rugby League project

1966 births
Living people
Australian rugby league players
Penrith Panthers players
Brisbane Broncos players
Souths Logan Magpies players
Rugby league wingers